HMS Vanguard was a 90-gun second-rate ship of the line of the Royal Navy, built at Portsmouth Dockyard and launched in 1678.

She ran onto Goodwin Sands in 1690, but was fortunate enough to be hauled off by the boatmen of Deal.

Vanguard took part in the Battle of Barfleur as part of Edward Russell's fleet, and then in the following action at La Hougue when French ships were burned in 1692.

Vanguard sank in the Great Storm of 1703, while laid up in ordinary at Chatham Dockyard, but was raised in 1704 for rebuilding. She was relaunched from Chatham on 2 August 1710 as a 90-gun second rate built to the 1706 Establishment. In 1739 she was renamed HMS Duke, and rebuilt for a second time at Woolwich as a 90-gun second rate. She was rebuilt according to the 1733 proposals of the 1719 Establishment, and relaunched on 28 April 1739.

In 1759, Duke, with a ship's complement of 800 souls under the command of Captain Samuel Graves, saw action during the Battle of Quiberon Bay. 
 
Duke was broken up in 1769.

Notes

References

 Lavery, Brian (2003) The Ship of the Line - Volume 1: The development of the battlefleet 1650-1850. Conway Maritime Press. .
 

 

Ships of the line of the Royal Navy
Shipwrecks in the Downs
Maritime incidents in 1703
1670s ships
Maritime incidents in 1690